The Hotham Valley Tourist Railway (commonly Hotham Valley Railway) is a tourist and heritage railway in the Peel region of Western Australia.

The railway operates over a 32 kilometre section of the original Pinjarra to Narrogin railway line, and has its origins in a small group of enthusiasts who met together in 1974 with the object of preserving both Western Australian steam locomotives and the railway line itself, from Pinjarra at least as far as Dwellingup. Dwellingup is now the primary centre of Hotham Valley's operations.

Today the railway operates both steam and diesel locomotive hauled trains on a variety of services and is staffed almost exclusively by volunteers.

It is one of only a handful of heritage railway organisations in Western Australia, and as of 2018 is the only heritage and/or tourist railway in the state regularly operating original  gauge Western Australian Government Railways steam locomotives.

History
In 1974, four local residents of Pinjarra formed the Pinjarra Steam & Hills Railway Preservation Society that later became the Hotham Valley Tourist Railway with the aim of operating steam trains on the Pinjarra to Narrogin railway line.

Initially four former Western Australian Government Railways W class locomotives were purchased. The first three (W920, W903 and W945) were returned to service in the 1970s, followed by the fourth (W908) in 1988. A fifth W class was purchased in 2013 (W947). Eight former Albany Progress carriages were leased and ultimately purchased outright in 1979.

In March 1976, the former Pinjarra Locomotive Depot was leased, officially opening on 17 July 1977. On 12 September 1976 the first train operated, a special from Perth to Dwellingup hauled by W920.

Appeals
Hotham Valley Railway host a number of appeals, some of which are ongoing. The appeals relate generally to restoration projects but have included an appeal to replace the seats in AV426 - Hotham Valley's 1919 vintage dining carriage, used regularly on the Etmilyn Forest Diner restaurant train.

Two appeals run during 2012 were to enable the complete purchase of steam locomotive W947 from Rail Heritage WA with a view to restoring it to operational condition. Although Hotham Valley already owns four W class engines, W947 will considerably strengthen the steam locomotive fleet and provides added interest with a unique pattern sand-dome which ultimately served as a prototype for those later employed on the WAGR V class. Work on W947's boiler continues as funds and resources become available, with one future option of marrying the boiler with W903's or W920's frame.

Another long-running appeal (dating back to 1977) is for the restoration of G71 'Menzies. G71 was built as a sister engine of Hotham Valley Railway's G123, part of a batch of 22 built by Dübs & Co of Scotland in 1897. Unlike G123, G71 spent most of its service years away from the WAGR operating instead with various privately owned timber companies. Whilst it will be some years (if not decades) before G71 will be operational, it is important to ensure equipment like this is kept for future generations of members as the funds and resources may become available.

Motive power

Overview
As of 2018, Hotham Valley railway owns and/or operates some twenty-two locomotives (eight steam and sixteen diesel), of which a total of seven are currently operational. In addition, the railway currently owns two ex-Western Australian Government Railways diesel railcars.

Steam locomotives
This is a list of steam locomotives currently in service with Hotham Valley Railway. Note: some items in this list are privately owned; or on long term lend and/or lease arrangements.

The In service date refers to original date of entry into the original owners' service.

Diesel locomotives and railcars
This is a list of diesel locomotives and diesel powered railcars in service with Hotham Valley Railway. Note: some items in this list are privately owned; or on long term lend and/or lease arrangements.

Visiting and past locomotives
In the past, some locomotives from other organisations have seen operation on Hotham Valley Railway services. Other locomotives have passed into different ownership after having first been owned/operated by Hotham Valley. Details of at least some of these locomotives are given in the following table:

Rolling stock

Passenger stock
The HVR's passenger rolling stock fleet was drawn from a number of sources: in addition to original WAGR carriages, Hotham Valley Railway also operates carriages converted from WAGR goods wagons and original passenger carriages from the Tasmanian Government Railways and South African Railways.

Riverland carriages
In 1987, Hotham Valley Railway acquired 25 second hand large Corten steel carriages from the South African Railways. Hotham Valley was expanding its mainline operations considerably and the Westrail owned carriages then in use on Hotham Valley's rail tours were no longer appropriate due to their age and other limitations.

The new fleet were converted into various types (including first and second class cars with and without guards compartments, buffet and dining cars) from SAR sleeping cars and all had been originally constructed during the 1960s and 70s. All of the cars were converted and refurbished prior to their shipment to Western Australia.

In Hotham Valley service, the cars were painted in green and cream livery with mustard roofs, reminiscent of the original WAGR colour scheme applied between the late 1950s and the mid-1970s. The cars all received names of Western Australian rivers (with the exception of AHF311 which was named Bloemfontein for the city where the cars were converted) and were given class designations and numbers in keeping with Westrail practise. The classes, names and numbers are listed in the table below.

Until the introduction of 48 X-class diesel locomotives in 1954, the naming of WAGR vehicles was rare. Only two classes of WAGR steam locomotive were given names: the Pr class of 1938 was named after Western Australian rivers while the S class of 1943 was named after Western Australian hills. The Hotham Valley Riverland cars were also named for Western Australian rivers and thus shared many names with the Pr class engines, all of which had been withdrawn by 1971.

References

Notes

Further reading

External links

 Official site
 Old website

Heritage railways in Australia
Railway lines in Western Australia
3 ft 6 in gauge railways in Australia
1974 establishments in Australia
Tourist railways in Western Australia
Shire of Murray